Yazmeen Ann Ryan (born February 25, 1999) is an American professional soccer player who plays as a midfielder for NJ/NY Gotham FC of the National Women's Soccer League (NWSL).

Early life
Ryan grew up in Norman, Oklahoma, and attended Norman North High School. She played for the club team Norman Celtic. As a freshman, she led Norman North to their first-ever girls soccer state championship.

TCU Horned Frogs
Ryan joined TCU as an attacking midfielder in 2017 and captained the team in 2020. She led the team to their first-ever Big 12 conference championship; however, Ryan missed the championship-clinching game due to injury.

Club career
Ryan played for Oklahoma City and was named to the club's all-time Best XI.

Portland Thorns
Ryan was drafted at No. 6 overall by the Portland Thorns in the 2021 NWSL Draft. Ryan was the Thorns' "top target". After they attempted to trade into the #4 draft position, the Thorns eventually traded two later picks plus an international slot to move up to select Ryan. Ryan appeared in the starting lineup for the Portland Thorns in the 2022 NWSL Championship Final on October 29, 2022.

NJ/NY Gotham FC
On January 5, 2023, Ryan was traded to NJ/NY Gotham FC as part of a three-team trade.

Honors 
Portland Thorns FC

 NWSL Championship: 2022

References

External links

TCU profile
Yazmeen Ryan on FBRef

American women's soccer players
Portland Thorns FC draft picks
TCU Horned Frogs women's soccer players
Living people
1999 births
African-American women's soccer players
21st-century African-American sportspeople
National Women's Soccer League players
21st-century African-American women
Women's association football midfielders
Portland Thorns FC players
Sportspeople from Norman, Oklahoma
Soccer players from Oklahoma